Tatur, also known as Tatoor, is a small Pashtun tribe among the larger Lodi/Lohani tribe. Like the rest of the Lodi tribes, they were nomadic for most of their existence before crossing the Gomal Pass and settling in the Gomal plains of present-day Tank District in modern-day Pakistan during the late 1500s.

History 
The Tatur currently exists as a tribe chiefly concentrated in one small village about four miles north-west of Tank city. The village in which the tribe currently resides was also mentioned by H. G. Raverty in his Notes on Afghanistan and part of Baluchistan book published in 1880. The tribe is referred to as Tataur, Tutor, and Tutohr in the book. The tribe was near extinction around 1872-79.

References 

Bettani Pashtun tribes